The Ferrier Lecture is a Royal Society lectureship given every three years "on a subject related to the advancement of natural knowledge on the structure and function of the nervous system". It was created in 1928 to honour the memory of Sir David Ferrier, a neurologist who was the first British scientist to electronically stimulate the brain for the purpose of scientific study.

In its 90-year history, the Lecture has been given 30 times. It has never been given more than once by the same person. The first female to be awarded the honour was Prof. Christine Holt in 2017. The first lecture was given in 1929 by Charles Scott Sherrington, and was titled "Some functional problems attaching to convergence". The most recent lecturer was provided by Prof. Christine Holt, who presented a lecture in 2017 titled "understanding of the key molecular mechanisms involved in nerve growth, guidance and targeting which has revolutionised our knowledge of growing axon tips". In 1971, the lecture was given by two individuals (David Hunter Hubel and Torsten Nils Wiesel) on the same topic, with the title "The function and architecture of the visual cortex".

List of Lecturers

References
General

Specific

Biology education in the United Kingdom
Neurology
Royal Society lecture series